Gabriel Leone Coutinho Miranda Frota (born 21 July 1993) is a Brazilian actor and musician. Leone became nationally known for his role in the telenovela Hidden Truths and gained international recognition as the lead role in Dom, the first original Amazon Prime Video series produced in Brazil.

Television

Cinema

External links

References

Living people
1993 births
Brazilian male film actors
Brazilian male telenovela actors
Male actors from Rio de Janeiro (city)